"Synchrogazer" is the 26th single by Japanese singer and voice actress Nana Mizuki, released on January 11, 2012 by King Records.

Track listing 
 "Synchrogazer"
Lyrics: Nana Mizuki
Composition: Noriyasu Agematsu
Arrangement: Noriyasu Agematsu
Opening theme for anime television series Senki Zesshō Symphogear
 "Love Brick"
Lyrics: Megumi Hinata, Nana Mizuki, Sayuri Katayama
Composition: Shinya Saitō
Arrangement: Hitoshi Fujima (Elements Garden)
Theme song for the Fuji TV Two Drama  Switch Girl!!
 
Lyrics: Shoko Fujibayashi
composition: Yu-pan.
Arrangement: Hitoshi Fujima (Elements Garden)

Charts
Oricon Sales Chart (Japan)

References

2012 singles
Nana Mizuki songs
Songs written by Nana Mizuki
2012 songs
King Records (Japan) singles